The Vertical Ray of the Sun is the third feature film by Vietnamese-born French director Trần Anh Hùng. It was released in 2000 and is the final part of what many now consider to be Tran's "Vietnam trilogy."

The film centres on three sisters who live in present-day Hanoi: Suong is the eldest, then Khanh in the middle, and Lien is the youngest. The film takes place over the course of one month, starting on the anniversary of their mother's death and ending on the anniversary of their father's. Tran was inspired to make the film after visiting Hanoi during a break in the filming of Cyclo during the Christmas holidays in 1994.

This drama was lensed in Vietnam's capital, Hanoi, as well as in Hạ Long Bay and the village of Luoi Ngoc, Quảng Ninh Province.

The film's original score is composed by Tôn-Thất Tiết. Additionally, three songs of the noted Vietnamese songwriter Trịnh Công Sơn are interspersed through the film, as are songs by The Velvet Underground, Lou Reed, Arab Strap, and The Married Monk.

The Vertical Ray of the Sun was screened in the Un Certain Regard section at the 2000 Cannes Film Festival.

Plot
On the anniversary of their mother's death, three sisters in contemporary Hanoi meet to prepare a memorial banquet. After the banquet, the calm exteriors of the sisters' lives begin to give way to more turbulent truths, which will affect their seemingly idyllic relationships. The eldest sister has a small boy nicknamed Little Mouse, and botanical photographer husband Quoc, who is prone to long absences from home. The middle sister has recently discovered that she is pregnant to her husband Kien, who is a writer suffering from writer's block. The flirtatious youngest sister constantly fantasises about being pregnant, and lives with her brother Hai, for whom she has a deep affection. With the brilliant Vietnamese summer as a setting, Vertical Ray of the Sun is beautiful from beginning to end, a charming, slow-paced, face value, family saga film.

Cast
 Tran Nu Yen Khe  as  Lien (Liên)
 Nguyễn Như Quỳnh  as  Suong (Sương)
 Le Khanh  as   Khanh (Khanh)
 Ngo Quang Hai  as  Hai (Hải)
 Chu Hung  as  Quoc (Quốc)
 Tran Manh Cuong  as  Kien (Kiên)
 Le Tuan Anh  as  Tuan (Tuấn)
 Le Ngoc Dung as  Huong (Hương)
 Do Thi Hai Yen  as Quoc's concubine

Alternate Titles

UK title: At the Height of Summer

References

External links

Official site
Rotten Tomatoes entry

2000 films
2000 drama films
French drama films
German drama films
Vietnamese-language films
Vietnamese drama films
Films directed by Tran Anh Hung
Films set in Vietnam
Films set in Hanoi
Sony Pictures Classics films
2000s French films
2000s German films